Alison Skipworth (born Alison Mary Elliott Margaret Groom; 25 July 18635 July 1952) was an English stage and screen actress.

Early years
Skipworth was born in London. She was the daughter of Dr. Richard Ebenezer Groom and Elizabeth Rodgers, and she had a private education.

Stage 
Alison Skipworth made her first stage appearance at Daly's Theatre in London in 1894, in A Gaiety Girl. Her first American performance came the following year at the Broadway Theatre in New York City. She sang in light opera in An Artist's Model. In this production she served as understudy to Marie Tempest. After performing in two London plays, Skipworth returned to the United States, and made it her home. She joined the company of Daniel Frohman at the Lyceum. There she made her debut as Mrs. Ware in The Princess and the Butterfly in 1897.

In 1905 and 1906 Skipworth toured with Viola Allen in three productions of Shakespeare, Cymbeline, Twelfth Night, and As You Like It. In the following years she played with James K. Hackett and John Drew, Jr., among other theatre celebrities. Productions in which she was featured are The Torch-Bearers, The Swan, The Enchanted April, The Grand Duchess and the Waiter, Mrs. Dane's Defence and Marseilles.

Film 
Skipworth appeared in her first film in 1912, A Mardi Gras Mix-Up. The same year she performed in The Pilgrimage, Into the Jungle, and A Political Kidnapping. In 1930 she made her first talkie, Strictly Unconventional. Skipworth appeared opposite W. C. Fields as his foil in four films: If I Had a Million (1932), Tillie and Gus (1933), Alice in Wonderland (1933), and Six of a Kind (1934). Her film career continued until 1938 with many major supporting roles. Her later screen credits include The Casino Murder Case, The Girl from 10th Avenue, King of the Newsboys, Wide Open Faces, and Ladies in Distress.

Personal life 
In 1882, Skipworth married Frank Markham Skipworth, an artist for whom she modeled; they later divorced. Nicknamed "Skippy", Skipworth resided in an ordinary Hollywood flat, drove a Ford, and drank tea daily in her own garden each afternoon when she was not working.

Death 
Skipworth died of natural causes on 5 July 1952 at her home in New York City.

Filmography

 A Mardi Gras Mix-Up (1912, Short) - The Doctor's Wife
 The Pilgrimage (1912, Short) - William's Mother
 Into the Jungle (1912, Short)
 A Political Kidnapping (1912, Short)
 39 East (1920) - Mrs. de Mailly
 Handcuffs or Kisses (1921) - Miss Strodd
 Big Pal (1925) - Agatha Briggs, truant officer (*uncredited)
 Strictly Unconventional (1930) - Lady Catherine Champion-Chene
 Raffles (1930) - Lady Kitty Melrose
 Outward Bound (1930) - Mrs. Cliveden-Banks
 Du Barry, Woman of Passion (1930) - La Gourdan
 Oh, For a Man! (1930) - Laura
 The Virtuous Husband (1931) - Mrs. Olwell
 The Night Angel (1931) - Countess von Martini
 Devotion (1931) - Mrs.Matilda Coggins
 The Road to Singapore (1931) - Mrs. Wey-Smith
 Tonight or Never (1931) - Marchesa Bianca San Giovanni
 The Unexpected Father (1932) - Mrs. Hawkins
 High Pressure (1932) - Mrs. Miller (uncredited)
 Sinners in the Sun (1932) - Mrs. Blake
 Madame Racketeer (1932) - Countess von Claudwig / Martha Hicks
 Night After Night (1932) - Miss Mabel Jellyman
 If I Had a Million (1932) - Emily La Rue
 Tonight Is Ours (1933) - Grand Duchess Emilie
 He Learned About Women (1933) - Mme. Vivienne Pompadour
 A Lady's Profession (1933) - Beulah Bonnell
 The Song of Songs (1933) - Mrs. Rasmussen
 Midnight Club (1933) - Lady Barrett-Smythe
 Tillie and Gus (1933) - Tillie Winterbottom
 Alice in Wonderland (1933) - Duchess
 Six of a Kind (1934) - Mrs. K. Rumford
 Coming Out Party (1934) - Miss Gertrude Vanderdoe
 Wharf Angel (1934) - Mother Bright
 Shoot the Works (1934) - The Countess
 The Notorious Sophie Lang (1934) - Aunt Nellie
 The Captain Hates the Sea (1934) - Mrs. Yolanda Magruder
 Here is My Heart (1934) - Countess Rostova
 The Casino Murder Case (1935) - Priscilla Kinkaid Llewellyn
 The Devil Is a Woman (1935) - Senora Perez
 The Girl from 10th Avenue (1935) - Mrs. Martin
 Becky Sharp (1935) - Miss Crawley
 Doubting Thomas (1935) - Mrs. Pampinelli
 Shanghai (1935) - Aunt Jane
 Dangerous (1935) - Mrs. Williams
 Hitch Hike Lady (1935) - Mrs. Amelia Blake
 The Princess Comes Across (1936) - Lady Gertrude
 Satan Met a Lady (1936) - Madame Barabbas
 The Gorgeous Hussy (1936) - Mrs. Beall
 Two in a Crowd (1936) - Lillie Eckleberger aka Lillie the Toad
 White Hunter (1936) - Aunt Frederika
 Stolen Holiday (1937) - Suzanne
 Two Wise Maids (1937) - Agatha Stanton / Old Lady Ironsides
 King of the Newsboys (1938) - Nora
 Wide Open Faces (1938) - Auntie Martha
 Ladies in Distress (1938) - Josephine Bonney (final film role)

See also

References

Sources
 The Times-News (Burlington, North Carolina), "Hollywood Gossip", 19 December 1933, page 7.
 The New York Times, "Alison Skipworth, actress, Dies at 88", 7 July 1952, page 21.
 Winnipeg Free Press, "Lyceum", 23 January 1936, page 24.

External links

 
 
 
 Alison Skipworth(Aveleyman)
Alison Skipworth in 1904(Minneapolis Journal May 14, 1904)
the cast of "The Swan" 1924, Skipworth 2nd from right bottom row
Skipworth probably again in 1904(archived) (*note her hair and attire matches the newspaper photo from the Minneapolis Journal May 14 1904)

1863 births
1952 deaths
20th-century English actresses
Actresses from London
British expatriate actresses in the United States
Burials at Kensico Cemetery
English women singers
English film actresses
English silent film actresses
English stage actresses
Paramount Pictures contract players